Ona or ONA may refer to:

Anthropology
 Ona people, an indigenous people of southern Argentina and Chile
 Ona language, a language once spoken in Isla Grande de Tierra del Fuego
 Ona, a pre-Aksumite culture in Sembel, Eritrea

Geography
 Ona, Sandøy, an island in Møre og Romsdal county, Norway
 Ona, Vestland, an island in Øygarden, Norway
 Ona River or Biryusa, a river in Irkutsk Oblast, Russia
 Ona, West Virginia, a community in the United States
 Ona, Florida, a community in the United States
 Ona River, in Russia
 Ona Ara, a local government area in Nigeria
 Ona Ona, a former neighborhood of Mount Bindango, Queensland, Australia
 Ona Station, a railway station in Kita-ku, Japan
 Ona Beach State Park, in Oregon, United States
 Oña, a town in Castile and León, Spain
 Oña Canton, a canton in Ecuador

Transportation
 Ona (yacht), former name of Al Raya
 Ontario (Amtrak station) (station code), in Ontario, California, United States
 Overseas National Airways, a defunct U.S. airline
 Winona Municipal Airport (IATA code), in Winona, Minnesota, United States

Organizations
 Office of National Assessments, an Australian intelligence agency
 , a Venezuelan anti-drug agency
 Office of Net Assessment, a U.S. defense agency
 Oman News Agency, an Omani government news agency
 ONA Group, a defunct Moroccan holding company
 Online News Association, a professional online journalists organization
 Ontario Nurses' Association, a Canadian trade union for registered nurses
 Open and affirming, a United Church of Christ program
 Order of Nine Angles, a Satanist organization

Other uses
 Ona (name)
 Ona (Blake), daughter of Urizen in William Blake's mythology
 ONA (restaurant), the first vegan restaurant in France to win a Michelin star
 O.N.A., a Polish heavy metal band
 Ona de Sants-Montjuïc, a radio station in Barcelona, Spain
 Ona Kantheeswarar Temple, a Hindu temple in Tamil Nadu, India
 Original net animation, an anime title directly released onto the Internet
 "Ona to zna", a song by the Serbian band Idoli
 Ona Lukoszaite, a character in the novel The Jungle by Upton Sinclair

See also
 Onna (disambiguation)

Language and nationality disambiguation pages
Lithuanian feminine given names